Pemirolast (INN) is a mast cell stabilizer used as an anti-allergic drug therapy. It is marketed under the tradenames Alegysal and Alamast.

Clinical trials studying treatments for allergic conjunctivitis have found that an ophthalmic solution containing levocabastine with pemirolast potassium may be more effective in alleviating symptoms than levocabastine alone. 

It has also been studied for the treatment of asthma.

Pemirolast has appeared as a possible candidate for SARS-CoV-2 (COVID-19) spike protein disruption and interference. Such results were ascertained by molecular dynamics calculations executed on the Summit supercomputer. By simulating compounds with FDA or similar regulatory approval, the authors found 4 interfacial molecules that could potentially disrupt the SARS-CoV-2 interface with ACE-2 receptors, suggesting that such small molecules could mitigate SARS-CoV-2 infection. The 4 candidate interfacial molecules included pemirolast, isoniazid pyruvate, nitrofurantoin, and eriodictyol.

References

External links 
 

H1 receptor antagonists
Tetrazoles
Lactams
Pyridopyrimidines